Crunch Time is an album by saxophonist Hank Crawford and organist Jimmy McGriff recorded in 1998 and released on the Milestone label the following year.

Reception 

AllMusic's Richard S. Ginell said: "Not much is new here -- which may be precisely the point of the exercise -- and while these sessions do not quite rise to the truckin' heights of some other McGriff Milestone discs from this period, there is still plenty to groove to in these track". In JazzTimes, Geraldine Wyckoff stated: "Crunch Time is classic Crawford/McGriff ... The sense of timing throughout this album and within these musicians is at the music’s essence. It’s the element which makes Crunch Time-and all of Crawford’s and McGriff’s music-so timeless".

Track listing
 "Bow Legs" (Hank Crawford) – 6:31
 "It's All Good" (Lewis Lebish, Melvin Sparks) – 8:10
 "Don't Deceive Me (Please Don't Go)" (Chuck Willis) – 5:43
 "Sandu" (Clifford Brown) – 7:09
 "Crunch Time" (Jimmy McGriff) – 7:12
 "What's Going On" (Marvin Gaye, Renaldo Benson, Al Cleveland) – 7:13
 "Without a Song" (Vincent Youmans, Edward Eliscu, Fred Rose) – 4:11
 "The Preacher" (Horace Silver) – 6:31

Personnel
Hank Crawford  – alto saxophone
Jimmy McGriff – organ
Melvin Sparks, Cornell Dupree (tracks 1, 3, 6 & 7) – guitar
Bernard Purdie − drums

References

Milestone Records albums
Hank Crawford albums
Jimmy McGriff albums
1999 albums
Albums produced by Bob Porter (record producer)
Albums recorded at Van Gelder Studio